A hepatotoxin (Gr., hepato = liver) is a toxic chemical substance that damages the liver.

It can be a side-effect, but hepatotoxins are also found naturally, such as microcystins and pyrrolizidine alkaloids, or in laboratory environments, such as carbon tetrachloride, or far more pervasively in the form of ethanol (drinking alcohol).

The effects of hepatotoxins depend on the amount, point of entry and distribution speed of the [toxin], and on the health of the person.

Intrinsic hepatotoxins (type A) have a predictable, dose-dependent effect.  Idiosyncratic (type B) hepatotoxic reactions are unpredictable, independent of dose, and appear to be determined by the individual exposed.  Compounds that preferentially affect bile ducts are referred to as "cholestatic", one example being chlorpromazine.  Those that target mostly the hepatocytes themselves are termed "hepatocellular", one example being paracetamol.  "Mixed" toxicity, affecting both the bile ducts and hepatocytes, is not uncommon.  Hepatocellular injury is clinically marked by a high ratio of ALT to ALP, and cholestatic injury by a lower ratio.

Hepatotoxic substances
 α-amanitin, a deadly cellular toxin found in Amanita phalloides mushroom (death cap) - intrinsic
 Aflatoxin - intrinsic
 Ethanol - intrinsic
 Halothane - idiosyncratic
 Paracetamol - intrinsic
 Pyrrolizidine alkaloids, found in many plants in the Boraginaceae, Compositae, and Leguminosae families - intrinsic
 Luteoskyrin
 Kava (disputed) - idiosyncratic
 Allyl alcohol - intrinsic
 Allopurinol - idiosyncratic
 Amiodarone - idiosyncratic
 Aroclor 1254
 Arsenic - intrinsic
 Carbamazepine - idiosyncratic
 Carbon tetrachloride - intrinsic
 Chlorpromazine - idiosyncratic
 Cocaethylene
 Diclofenac - idiosyncratic
 Diethylnitrosamine
 Dimethylformamide
 Diquat
 Etoposide
 Indomethacin - idiosyncratic
 Inhalants
 Iproniazid (withdrawn) - idiosyncratic
 Methapyrilene
 Methotrexate
 3-methylcholanthrene.
 All penicillins - idiosyncratic
 Sulfonamide antibiotics - idiosyncratic
 Tricyclic antidepressants - idiosyncratic

See also
 Mycotoxins
 Hepatotoxicity
 Nephrotoxicity
 Neurotoxicity
 Ototoxicity

References

Toxins by organ system affected
Hepatology
Hepatotoxins